Aislelabs Inc. is a Toronto-based technology company offering the most advanced WiFi analytics and marketing platforms in the market. Aislelabs' AI-powered engine enables entities to harness the power of WiFi through location analytics and marketing automation.

Aislelabs is headquartered out of Toronto with offices in Dubai, London (UK) and India. Aislelabs' products are deployed at more than 1000+ locations across 25 countries. Aislelabs is recognized with the ISO 27001 certification. 

Aislelabs provides location analytics, predictive forecasting, personalized marketing, and digital advertising features in partnership with enterprise Wi-Fi vendors such as Cisco, Aruba Networks, Ruckus Wireless, and Open Mesh.

History 

Aislelabs was founded by Nilesh Bansal and Nick Koudas, who previously founded Sysomos. After the acquisition of Sysomos by Marketwired, the two created the marketing and analytics platform for the physical brick n' mortar spaces as Aislelabs. While Aislelabs does not have a direct relationship with the University of Toronto, previously Sysomos was a spinoff from the research project BlogScope which started in 2005, and both founders are a recipient of the University of Toronto' Inventor of the Year award.

Aislelabs raised venture capital from Salesforce.com and other institutional investors in 2014.

As of 2017, the company serves thousands of large venues across North America, Europe, and Asia, including the most visited place on the planet, The Dubai Mall with 80+ million annual visitors. Across the install base, Aislelabs' big data platform processes over 275 billion data point a year.

Competitors

The top competitors in Aislelabs competitive landscape are Cloud4Wi, Purple WiFi, Queentessence, Eleven Wireless, Zenreach & Skyfii.

Reports 

The Hitchhikers Guide to iBeacon Hardware is the most extensive third-party series of study on iBeacons and their power consumption. Multiple reports were published as part of this work.

References

External links 

 Official website

Canadian companies established in 2013